The rusty-crowned ground sparrow (Melozone kieneri) is a species of bird in the family Passerellidae that is endemic to western and southwestern Mexico. The species occurs both in the Sierra Madre Occidental range, and the Cordillera Neovolcanica mountain belt.

The rusty-crowned ground sparrow's natural habitats are subtropical or tropical dry forest, subtropical or tropical high-altitude shrubland, and heavily degraded former forest.

Description
Its size ranges from six to seven inches (15–17.5 cm). The adult has a rufous crown with white lore spot and its face is olive brown with white eye ring while the upper parts grayish olive. Its throat and underparts are white with a black central chest spot and the undertail covers are pale cinnamon. Juveniles are dusky brown on the upper parts with the throat and underparts dirty pale lemon, streaked with brown.

References

Howell, Steve N. G. and Webb, Sophie. 1995. A Guide to the Birds Of Mexico and Northern Central America. Oxford University Press.

External links
Photo
Photo; Article

rusty-crowned ground sparrow
Endemic birds of Western Mexico
Birds of the Sierra Madre Occidental
Birds of the Sierra Madre del Sur
Birds of the Trans-Mexican Volcanic Belt
rusty-crowned ground sparrow
rusty-crowned ground sparrow
Taxonomy articles created by Polbot